Bemelmans is a surname. Notable people with that surname: 
 Fons Bemelmans (born 1938) Dutch artist 
 Ludwig Bemelmans  (1898–1962), Austria-Hungary -born American writer and illustrator of children's books 
 Bemelmans Bar in the Carlyle Hotel, New York City, named after Ludwig Bemelmans
 Madeleine Bemelmans (born Madeleine Freund), animal rights activist
 Ruben Bemelmans (born 1988), Belgian professional tennis player 
 Theo Bemelmans (born 1943), Dutch computer scientist

Other uses
Bemelmans (restaurant), a famous Toronto eatery located at 83 Bloor Street West that ran from 1977 until 1994 and was owned by Tom Kristenbrun's Chrysalis Group

Surnames